The 1971 Texas–Arlington Mavericks football team was an American football team that represented the University of Texas at Arlington in the Southland Conference during the 1971 NCAA College Division football season. In their first year under head coach John Symank, the team compiled a 2–9 record. 

In December 1970, former Arlington State back John Symank was hired as head coach from Northern Arizona. The 1971 season also marked the first UTA competed as the Mavericks after previously being known as the Rebels since 1951. The name Mavericks was selected by the student body over Toros and the name change was undertaken after the Rebels moniker became increasingly controversial due to its association with the Confederacy.

Schedule

References

Texas–Arlington
Texas–Arlington Mavericks football seasons
Texas–Arlington Mavericks football